German submarine U-739 was a Type VIIC U-boat built for Nazi Germany's Kriegsmarine for service during World War II.
She was laid down on 17 April 1942 by Schichau-Werke, Danzig as yard number 1536, launched on 23 December 1942 and commissioned on 6 March 1943 under Leutnant zur See Ernst Mangold.

Design
German Type VIIC submarines were preceded by the shorter Type VIIB submarines. U-739 had a displacement of  when at the surface and  while submerged. She had two shafts and two  propellers.

U-739 was fitted with five  torpedo tubes (four fitted at the bow and one at the stern), fourteen torpedoes, one  SK C/35 naval gun, 220 rounds, and two twin  C/30 anti-aircraft guns. The boat had a complement of between forty-four and sixty.

Service history
The boat's career began with training at 8th U-boat Flotilla on 6 March 1943, followed by active service on 1 November 1943 as part of the 9th Flotilla. Just two months later she transferred to 13th Flotilla for the remainder of her service.

In eight patrols she sank one warship for a total of 625 tons.

Wolfpacks
U-739 took part in eight wolfpacks, namely:
 Isegrim (16 – 27 January 1944)
 Werwolf (27 January – 2 February 1944)
 Boreas (28 February – 5 March 1944)
 Keil (16 – 20 April 1944)
 Donner & Keil (20 April – 3 May 1944)
 Trutz (7 – 10 July 1944)
 Greif (5 August – 26 September 1944)
 Rasmus (6 – 13 February 1945)

Fate
U-739 surrendered on 13 May 1945 at Emden. Sunk later on 16 December 1945, in position  in Operation Deadlight.

Summary of raiding history

References

Notes

Citations

Bibliography

External links

German Type VIIC submarines
1942 ships
U-boats commissioned in 1943
U-boats sunk in 1945
Operation Deadlight
World War II shipwrecks in the Atlantic Ocean
World War II submarines of Germany
Ships built in Danzig
Maritime incidents in December 1945
Ships built by Schichau
Submarines sunk by aircraft as targets